The 2020 Georgia Bulldogs baseball team represents the University of Georgia during the 2020 NCAA Division I baseball season. The Bulldogs play their home games at Foley Field as a member of the Southeastern Conference They are led by head coach Scott Stricklin, in his seventh year as head coach.

Previous season

The Bulldogs finished the 2019 season with a 46–17 record, compiling a 21–9 mark in the SEC. They lost in the Athens Regional during the 2019 NCAA Division I baseball tournament.

2019 MLB draft
The Bulldogs had eight players drafted in the 2019 MLB draft.

Personnel

Roster

Coaching staff

Schedule

Schedule Source:
*Rankings are based on the team's current ranking in the D1Baseball poll.

2020 MLB draft

References

Georgia
Georgia Bulldogs baseball seasons
Georgia Bulldogs baseball